Parapedobacter pyrenivorans is a Gram-negative and non-motile bacterium from the genus of Parapedobacter. Parapedobacter pyrenivorans has the ability to degrade pyrene.

References

External links 
Type strain of Parapedobacter pyrenivorans at BacDive -  the Bacterial Diversity Metadatabase

Sphingobacteriia
Bacteria described in 2013